

Silo Point, formerly known as the Baltimore and Ohio Locust Point Grain Terminal Elevator, is a residential complex converted from a high-rise grain elevator on the edge of the Locust Point neighborhood in Baltimore, Maryland. When the original grain elevator was completed in 1923, it was the largest and fastest in the world. The silo was built by the Baltimore and Ohio Railroad in 1923–1924, with a capacity of 3.8 million bushels (134 thousand m3). In 2009 it had been converted from a grain elevator to a condominium tower containing 24 floors and 228 condominiums by Turner Development Group and architect Parameter, Inc.

The grain elevator was listed on the National Register of Historic Places in 2004.

Gallery

See also
List of tallest buildings in Baltimore
 List of grain elevators
 National Register of Historic Places listings in Maryland

References

External links
Official website

Locust Point, Baltimore
Grain elevators in the United States
Agricultural buildings and structures on the National Register of Historic Places in Baltimore
Residential condominiums in the United States
Residential skyscrapers in Baltimore
Baltimore and Ohio Railroad
Residential buildings completed in 2009
2009 establishments in Maryland